The men's individual road race was a road bicycle racing event held as part of the Cycling at the 1968 Summer Olympics programme. 144 cyclists from 44 nations took part. The maximum number of cyclists per nation was four. It was held on 23 October 1968. The course, just short of 25 kilometres, was covered 8 times for a total distance of 196.2 kilometres. The event was won by Pierfranco Vianelli of Italy, the nation's second consecutive victory in the men's individual road race (putting Italy over France in most gold medals, three to two). It was the fourth consecutive Games that an Italian cyclist finished first or second. Leif Mortensen's silver was Denmark's second consecutive silver medal in the event. Gösta Pettersson earned Sweden's first medal in the event with his bronze.

Background

This was the eighth appearance of the event, previously held in 1896 and then at every Summer Olympics since 1936. It replaced the individual time trial event that had been held from 1912 to 1932 (and which would be reintroduced alongside the road race in 1996). There "was no heavy favorite as the last three World Championships had seen nine different riders on the podium."

Barbados, Costa Rica, Cuba, the Democratic Republic of the Congo, Ecuador, El Salvador, Guatemala, Lebanon, and Madagascar each made their debut in the men's individual road race; West Germany competed separately for the first time. Great Britain made its eighth appearance in the event, the only nation to have competed in each appearance to date.

Competition format and course

The mass-start race was on a course that covered eight laps of a 24.525 kilometres circuit, for a total of 196.2 kilometres. It was a "quite hilly" course.

Schedule

All times are Central Standard Time (UTC-6)

Results

References

Cycling at the Summer Olympics – Men's road race
Road cycling at the 1968 Summer Olympics